Gabriel dos Santos Nascimento (born 5 March 1983 in Porto Alegre), known as Gabriel Santos, is a Brazilian footballer who plays as a centre back. He began his career with Ponte Preta. He played for Palmeiras, who loaned him first to Fluminense and then to Sport. His time in Recife was cut short after seven games when Palmeiras sold him to Hapoel Tel Aviv. After a period in Hapoel Tel Aviv which ended in January 2008, he came back to Recife.

Honours

Club
Sport
Copa do Brasil: 2008

International
Brazil U20
FIFA U-20 World Cup: 2003

References

External links

1983 births
Living people
Brazilian footballers
Brazil under-20 international footballers
Brazilian expatriate footballers
Campeonato Brasileiro Série A players
Campeonato Brasileiro Série B players
Campeonato Brasileiro Série C players
Associação Atlética Ponte Preta players
Sociedade Esportiva Palmeiras players
Fluminense FC players
Sport Club do Recife players
América Futebol Clube (MG) players
Ceará Sporting Club players
Associação Desportiva Recreativa e Cultural Icasa players
Villa Nova Atlético Clube players
Tupi Football Club players
Esporte Clube São Bento players
Associação Portuguesa de Desportos players
Hapoel Tel Aviv F.C. players
Nacional Atlético Clube (SP) players
Association football central defenders
Brazilian expatriate sportspeople in Israel
Expatriate footballers in Israel
Pan American Games medalists in football
Pan American Games silver medalists for Brazil
Footballers at the 2003 Pan American Games
Medalists at the 2003 Pan American Games
Footballers from Porto Alegre